1873 in sports describes the year's events in world sport.

American football
College championship
 College football national championship – Princeton Tigers
Events
 19 October — representatives of Yale Bulldogs, Columbia Lions, Princeton Tigers and Rutgers Scarlet Knights meet at the Fifth Avenue Hotel in New York City to codify the first set of intercollegiate football rules.

Association football
England
 FA Cup final – The Wanderers 2–0 Oxford University at Lillie Bridge in London
Scotland
 13 March — formation of the Scottish Football Association (SFA).  Queen's Park and Third Lanark are among the original members. 
 The Scottish Football Association Challenge Cup, commonly known as the Scottish Cup, is launched by the Scottish Football Association as a knockout cup competition ahead of the 1873–74 season.

Australian rules football
Events
 St Kilda Football Club established.

Baseball
National championship
 National Association of Professional Base Ball Players champion – Boston Red Stockings (second consecutive season)

Boxing
Events
 23 September — Tom Allen becomes the undisputed Heavyweight Champion of America when he defeats Mike McCoole in the 7th round at "Chateau Island" near St. Louis, Missouri.
 29 October — McCoole is arrested and later convicted for shooting another pugilist called Patsy Mavery at St. Louis.  This ends his career.
 18 November — Allen defends his title against Ben Hogan at Pacific City, Iowa.  In the third round, Hogan claims a foul but is refused by the referee.  A riot erupts and the bout is forced to end, being declared a draw.  Allen retains the American Championship but does not fight again until 1876.

Canadian football
Events
 Toronto Argonauts founded by the Argonaut Rowing Club

Cricket
Events
 Player qualification rules are introduced with players having to decide at the start of a season whether they will play for their county of birth or their county of residence. Until now, it has been quite common for a player to play for two counties during the course of a single season. Increasing media interest in county cricket enables a semi-official championship to be inaugurated, based on media consensus.
England
 Champion County – Gloucestershire shares the title with Nottinghamshire
 Most runs – W. G. Grace 1805 @ 72.20 (HS 192*)
 Most wickets – James Southerton 148 @ 13.96 (BB 8–113)

Golf
Major tournaments
 British Open – Tom Kidd

Horse racing
Events
 Inaugural running of the Preakness Stakes is won by Survivor 
England
 Grand National – Disturbance
 1,000 Guineas Stakes – Cecilia
 2,000 Guineas Stakes – Gang Forward
 The Derby – Doncaster
 The Oaks – Marie Stuart
 St. Leger Stakes – Marie Stuart
Australia
 Melbourne Cup – Don Juan
Canada
 Queen's Plate – Mignonette
Ireland
 Irish Grand National – Torrent
 Irish Derby Stakes – Kyrle Daly 
USA
 Preakness Stakes – Survivor
 Belmont Stakes – Springbok

Rowing
The Boat Race
 29 March — Cambridge wins the 30th Oxford and Cambridge Boat Race

Rugby football
Events
 3 March — formation of the Scottish Rugby Football Union in a meeting held at Glasgow Academy, Elmbank Street, Glasgow. Eight clubs are represented at the foundation: Glasgow Academicals; Edinburgh Academical Football Club; West of Scotland F.C.; University of St Andrews Rugby Football Club; Royal High School FP; Merchistonians; Edinburgh University and Glasgow University.
 Gloucester RFC, Halifax, Hawick RFC, Salford RLFC, St Helens R.F.C., Wakefield Trinity RLFC and Widnes RLFC all established in 1873.

References

 
Sports by year